The Lebanon women's national under-17 basketball team is the junior women's national basketball team, administered by Lebanese Basketball Federation, that represents Lebanon in international under-17 and under-16 women's basketball competitions.

History 

The team participated in the 2022 FIBA Under-16 Women's Asian Championship, qualifying to the semi-finals and finishing fourth in the B division of the tournament.

Tournament records

Asia Championship

Latest Scores

2022 FIBA U16 Women's Asian Championship

Statistics

Asia Championship

See also
Sport in Lebanon
Lebanon women's national basketball team
Lebanon men's national basketball team
Lebanon men's national under-19 basketball team
Lebanon men's national under-17 basketball team

References

External links
Official website

Basketball in Lebanon
Women's national under-17 basketball teams
Basketball